The Industrial and Commercial Panel is one of five vocational panels which together elect 43 of the 60 members of Seanad Éireann, the upper house of the Oireachtas (the legislature of Ireland). The Industrial and Commercial Panel elects nine senators.

Election
Article 18 of the Constitution of Ireland provides that 43 of the 60 senators are to be elected from five vocational panels. The Industrial and Commercial Panel is defined in Article 18.7.1º(v) as "Industry and Commerce, including banking, finance, accountancy, engineering and architecture". The Seanad returning officer maintains a list of nominating bodies for each of the five panels. Candidates may be nominated either by four members of the Oireachtas or by a nominating body. The electorate consists of city and county councillors and current members of the Oireachtas. As the Seanad election takes place after the election to the Dáil, the Oireachtas members are the members of the incoming Dáil and the outgoing Seanad. Nine senators are elected on the Industrial and Commercial Panel, at least three of whom must have been nominated by Oireachtas members and at least three must have been nominated by nominating bodies.

Senators

Notes

List of nominating bodies
The following bodies are on the register of nominating bodies maintained by the Seanad Returning Officer for the Industrial and Commercial Panel.

Association of Advertisers in Ireland
Association of Patent and Trade Mark Attorneys
The Caravan, Camping and Mobile Home Society Limited
Chambers of Commerce of Ireland
Chartered Institute of Logistics & Transport in Ireland
Construction Industry Federation
Credit Union Development Association Co-operative Society
Electrical Industries Federation of Ireland
Freight Transport Association Ireland
Hardware Association Ireland
Independent Broadcasters of Ireland
Institute of Advertising Practitioners in Ireland
Institute of Bankers in Ireland
Institute of Certified Public Accountants in Ireland
Institute of Chartered Accountants in Ireland
Institution of Engineers of Ireland
Institute of Industrial Engineers
Institute of Management Consultants and Advisers
Institute of Professional Auctioneers & Valuers
Insurance Institute of Ireland
Insurance Ireland
Irish Business and Employers Confederation
Irish Computer Society
Irish Country Houses and Restaurants Association
Irish Exporters Association
Irish Hospitality Institute
Irish Hotels Federation
Irish Internet Association Limited
Irish Planning Institute
Irish Postmasters' Union
Irish Road Haulage Association
Irish Tourist Industry Confederation
Irish Small and Medium Enterprise Association (ISME)
Licensed Vintners' Association
Marketing Institute of Ireland
Marketing Society Limited
National Housebuilding Guarantee Company Limited
National Off-Licence Association
Nursing Homes Ireland
Restaurants Association of Ireland
Retail Excellence
Retail, Grocery, Dairy and Allied Trades Association (RGDATA)
Royal Institute of the Architects of Ireland
Society of Chartered Surveyors Ireland
Society of the Irish Motor Industry
Vintners' Federation of Ireland
Wholesale Produce Ireland

References

Seanad constituencies